Jean Link (3 September 1938 – 4 June 2020) was a Luxembourgian Olympic fencer. He competed in the individual and team foil events at the 1960 Summer Olympics.

Link died on 4 June 2020, aged 81.

References

External links
 

1938 births
2020 deaths
Luxembourgian male foil fencers
Olympic fencers of Luxembourg
Fencers at the 1960 Summer Olympics
Sportspeople from Luxembourg City